The 2021–22 FC Akhmat Grozny season was the 13th successive season that the club played in the Russian Premier League, the highest tier of association football in Russia. They also played in the Russian Cup, but were eliminated in the first round.

Season events
On 18 May, Akhmat Grozny announced the signing of Mohamed Konaté from Khimki, on a one-year contract with the option of an additional two years.

On 11 June, Daniil Utkin joined Akhmat Grozny on a season-long loan deal from Krasnodar.

On 23 June, Vitali Lystsov joined Akhmat Grozny on a season-long loan deal from Lokomotiv Moscow, Artyom Arkhipov joined on loan for the season from Kuban Krasnodar, and Odise Roshi left the club after his contract with terminated by mutual consent.

On 12 July, Igor Konovalov joined Akhmat Grozny on a season-long loan deal from Rubin Kazan.

On 24 July, Vladislav Karapuzov joined Akhmat Grozny on a season-long loan deal from Dynamo Moscow.

On 31 July, Artyom Timofeyev joined Akhmat Grozny on a permanent transfer from Spartak Moscow, having seen the previous season on loan at the club.

On 7 August, Andrés Ponce left Akhmat Grozny after his contract was terminated by mutual agreement.

On 3 September, Akhmat Grozny announced the season-long loan signing of Darko Todorović from Red Bull Salzburg.

On 7 September, Akhmat Grozny announced the signing of Senin Sebai from Khimki on a one-year contract, with the option to extend it for an additional season.

On 5 October, Mbengue unilaterally terminated his loan deal with Dinamo Minsk, and contract with Akhmat Grozny, to join Maccabi Petah Tikva.

On 17 February, Akhmat Grozny announced the signing of Aleksandr Troshechkin from Khimki on a contract until the summer of 2024.

On 3 March, Artem Polyarus terminated his contract with Akhmat Grozny.

Squad

On loan

Left club during season

Transfers

In

Loans in

Out

Loans out

Released

Trial

Friendlies

Competitions

Overview

Premier League

Results summary

Results by round

Results

League table

Russian Cup

Round of 32

Squad statistics

Appearances and goals

|-
|colspan="14"|Players away from the club on loan:

|-
|colspan="14"|Players who appeared for Akhmat Grozny but left during the season:

|}

Goal scorers

Clean sheets

Disciplinary record

References

FC Akhmat Grozny seasons
Akhmat Grozny